Bodianus bathycapros, is a species of wrasse native to tropical and warm temperate waters of the Pacific Ocean, particularly the Hawaiian Islands. It is an oviparous species in which the male and female form distinct pairs when spawning.

References

Further reading
Parenti, Paolo, and John E. Randall. "Checklist of the species of the families Labridaeand Scaridae: an update." (2011).

External links

bathycapros
Taxa named by Martin F. Gomon
Fish described in 2006